The Osaka Auto Messe (大阪オートメッセ) is an annual auto show that is held at Intex Osaka in Osaka, Japan since 1997. It focuses on modified car and car after parts.

It is one of the biggest auto shows in Japan. Usually, it is held for 3 days on a weekend on the middle of February. More than 200,000 people attend it almost every session. In an ordinary year, most of the famous car makers, parts makers and tuners bring their latest demo-cars to the exhibit.

History
It has been held every year since January, 1997.
1997(1st)  Intex Osaka         151,741 people
1998(2nd)  Kyocera Dome Osaka  188,238 
1999(3rd)  Intex Osaka         192,921 
2000(4th)  Intex Osaka         227,423 
2001(5th)  Intex Osaka         228,527 
2002(6th)  Intex Osaka         208,209 
2003(7th)  Intex Osaka         217,345 
2004(8th)  Intex Osaka         225,871 
2005(9th)  Intex Osaka         249,140 
2006(10th)  Intex Osaka         231,005
2007(11th)  Intex Osaka         249,746  (date: 10 to 12, February, 2007).
2008(12th)  Intex Osaka         239,677
2009(13th)  Intex Osaka         236,801
2010(14th)  Intex Osaka         210,118
2011(15th)  Intex Osaka         217,037
2012(16th)  Intex Osaka         205,756
2013(17th)  Intex Osaka         217,107
2014(18th)  Intex Osaka         205,545
2015(19th)  Intex Osaka         219,961
2016(20th)  Intex Osaka         223,801
2017(21st)  Intex Osaka         223,983
2018(22nd)  Intex Osaka         217,507
2019(23rd)  Intex Osaka         262,277
2020(24th)  Intex Osaka         207,479 (date: 14 to 16, February, 2020) 
2021(25th)  Intex Osaka         ---,---

Next session
2021/February 12, 13 and 14th at Intex Osaka

Study
Avex makes a stage performance show every year. The famous vocalist Kumi Koda appeared on stage there in 2005. Dave Rodgers composed a special song for the expo in 2004 and performed it in the same year as well. 
Tamiya holds their "R/C CAR GRAND PRIX in AUTO MESSE" with a special R/C car circuit link in the site.

External links

 OSAKA AUTO MESSE official web site in Japanese and in English.

Tourist attractions in Osaka
Auto shows in Japan
Recurring events established in 1997
1997 establishments in Japan
Winter events in Japan